The Barnstormer is a junior roller coaster. It is located in the Storybook Circus section of the Magic Kingdom at the Walt Disney World Resort. The Great Goofini's Barnstormer is the successor to The Barnstormer at Goofy's Wiseacre Farm which closed in February 2011 as part of the Fantasyland expansion.

History

Grandma Duck's Petting Farm (1988–1996)
A petting zoo named Grandma Duck's Petting Farm previously occupied the site where The Barnstormer now sits. This petting zoo was located in the Mickey's Birthdayland section of Fantasyland and was home to Minnie Moo, a holstein cow that was famous for having a Hidden Mickey on her side. In 1996 the petting zoo was removed and Minnie Moo was relocated to Fort Wilderness. She later died from natural causes. The barn which housed the petting zoo was integrated into The Barnstormer at Goofy's Wiseacre Farm.

The Barnstormer at Goofy's Wiseacre Farm (1996–2011)

After the closure of Grandma Duck's Petting Farm in early 1996, the Magic Kingdom began construction on a junior roller coaster called The Barnstormer at Goofy's Wiseacre Farm. It opened in Mickey's Toontown Fair on October 1, 1996. The Barnstormer was one of three attractions at American Disney parks which took its name from former attractions at the now-defunct Opryland USA theme park in Nashville, Tennessee. The other two attractions are Grizzly River Run at Disney California Adventure Park and Rock 'n' Roller Coaster at Disney's Hollywood Studios.

The Barnstormer at Goofy's Wiseacre Farm appeared to be an airplane school taught by Goofy. The story behind this ride included guests flying in Goofy's homemade biplane as it swooped, twisted and turned. It then went full speed into a barn. Inside the barn were three Audio-Animatronic chickens from Epcot's former World of Motion attraction. A Hidden Mickey formed by a jumble of wires could be found in the attraction's queue near the "popcorn plants".

As part of the Fantasyland expansion, the attraction closed on February 12, 2011 to be rethemed to the Great Goofini.

The Barnstormer (2011–present)
From 2011 to 2014, Magic Kingdom's Fantasyland  underwent a large expansion and renovation. Mickey's Toontown Fair closed permanently on February 12, 2011 in order to make way for the expansion. Some elements of Mickey's Toontown Fair have been demolished and others have been re-themed to a new Storybook Circus area. The Barnstormer at Goofy's Wiseacre Farm was re-themed to The Barnstormer featuring Goofy as the Great Goofini. New Fantasyland opened in stages. The first stage, which opened in early 2012, contained the first half of Storybook Circus, including the new re-themed Barnstormer, at which the crash-out barn had been removed. On the back of the entrance sign, however, one can find a set of red painted jumbled letters that, when put together, spell Wiseacre Farm as an homage to both the original version of the ride and Mickey's Toontown Fair.

Ride
Guests board one of two trains which each seat 16 riders.

See also
 2012 in amusement parks
 Gadget's Go Coaster, a similar ride at Mickey's Toontown in Disneyland and Toontown in Tokyo Disneyland.
 Goofy's Sky School, a similarly-themed ride at Disney California Adventure.

References

Walt Disney Parks and Resorts attractions
Magic Kingdom
Roller coasters at the Magic Kingdom
Goofy (Disney)
Fantasyland
Audio-Animatronic attractions
Roller coasters introduced in 1996
Roller coasters introduced in 2012
Amusement rides that closed in 2011
1996 establishments in Florida